DHP may refer to:

Damascus–Hama and Extensions (Damas-Hamah et Prolongements), a former Lebanese railway line
Sika Club Beirut, also known as D.H.P., a former association football club in Lebanon
Dark Horse Presents, a former anthology comic-book by Dark Horse Comics
 David Hyde Pierce, an American actor, best known for his role on Frasier
 Defense Health Program, the enterprise within the United States Department of Defense that provides health care 
 German-Hanoverian Party (Deutsch-Hannoversche Partei), a defunct political party of Germany
 Revolutionary People's Party (disambiguation), political parties in Turkey
 Dhammapada, a versified Buddhist scripture 
 Diffie–Hellman problem, a problem in cryptography
 Dihydropyran, a chemical used in organic synthesis
 Dihydropyridine, a chemical used in pharmacology
 Discretionary Housing Payment, a discretionary housing-cost benefit in the UK
 Dunman High Programme, an Integrated Programme offered in Dunman High School, Singapore
 Cav1.1, calcium channel, a voltage-dependent, L type, alpha 1S subunit
 Damascus–Hama Railway, a Franco-Ottoman railway in Syria